Lobanove is a village located in Dzhankoi Raion, Crimea. Population:

See also
Dzhankoi Raion

References

Villages in Crimea